The Pirate Party is a political NGO and self-styled political party in Latvia. Based on the model of the Sweden Pirate Party, it supports strengthening citizens' rights, reform of copyright and changes in patent laws.  The party was founded in 2010 in Riga, and is a member of Pirate Parties International.

The "Pirate Society" was registered on March 6, 2012. The 'party' never registered as one and continues as a NGO.

By 2012, the party claimed to have 6 activists, more than 400 members on the Facebook group, nearly 200 followers on Twitter, and 9 people attending the latest weekly pirate bar. As of 2016, the party was still active and, as of 2021, is still listed as an active member of Pirate Party International.

References

External links
 Website

Latvia
Political parties in Latvia
Internet privacy organizations
Internet-related activism
Computer law organizations
Intellectual property activism
Privacy organizations
Civil liberties advocacy groups
Intellectual property organizations
Digital rights organizations